Kelletia is a genus of large sea snails, whelks, a marine gastropod molluscs in the family Austrosiphonidae, the true whelks.

Distribution
One extant species Kelletia lischkei occurs in the Sea of Japan off the coasts of Japan and South Korea, and another K. kelletii is found of along the coasts of California, United States and in the Baja California, Mexico.

Fossil species are documented in Japan, California, and Ecuador.

Evolution
A molecular phylogeny of Buccinidae based on the mitochondrial 16S rRNA gene  suggested that Kelletia is a closely related to Penion, a true whelk genus with extant species distributed in waters off of New Zealand and Australia. Results of a further molecular phylogenetic studies using mitochondrial genomic and nuclear ribosomal DNA sequence data re-affirmed this relationship, and also demonstrated that Kelletia and Antarctoneptunea found in the southern Pacific and Southern oceans are sister clades. The common ancestor of the three genera most likely evolved in the southern Pacific Ocean, and a lineage leading to Kelletia dispersed over millions of years up the western coast of the Americas into the northern Pacific Ocean. Radulae and opercula morphology is similar between Penion and Kelletia.

Species

Extant Species

Fossils
 † Kelletia brevis (Ozaki, 1954)
 † Kelletia ecuadoriana (Olsson, 1964)
 † Kelletia kanakoffi (Hertlein, 1970)
 † Kelletia kettlemanensis (Arnold, 1910)
 † Kelletia lorata (Addicott, 1970)
 † Kelletia posoensis (Anderson & Martin, 1914)
 † Kelletia rugosa (Olsson, 1964)
 † Kelletia vladimiri (Kanakoff, 1954)

References

External links

 World Register of Marine Species: Kelletia Bayle in P. Fischer, 1884
 Fossilworks Database Kelletia Fischer 1884 (true whelk)

Austrosiphonidae